is a Japanese actor, voice actor, singer, songwriter and radio personality who was formerly affiliated with I'm Enterprise and Pro-Fit. He is the only "live-action" character (as he played "himself" in Lucky☆Star) in the Newtype Anime magazine to be featured in the Monthly Top-10 Most-Popular Male Character charts. He played himself in Episode 6 of Kiddy Girl-and as a voice actor in a voice actor cafe.  Other roles include Taniguchi in the Haruhi Suzumiya series, and Itsuki Takeuchi in the Initial D reboot feature films in 2014.

Minoru married on August 9, 2011, but has chosen to keep his wife's identity anonymous.

On December 29, 2015, Minoru revealed that he has facial paralysis, making him unable to move the right side of his face. He is currently taking medication and undergoing treatment.

Filmography

Anime

D.N.Angel (2003), Takeshi Saehara
Fafner of the Azure (2004), Kenji Kondou
Bobobo-bo Bo-bobo (2005), Super Rabbit, Chikuwan
Mahou Sensei Negima (2005), Seruhiko-sensei
The Melancholy of Haruhi Suzumiya (2006), Taniguchi
The Skull Man (2007), Police Officer
Lucky ☆ Star (2007), Himself
Ga-rei -Zero- (2008), Kazuki Sakuraba, Kensuke Nimura
The Melancholy of Haruhi-chan Suzumiya/Nyorōn Churuya-san (2009), (Taniguchi/Kimidori-san)
Kiddy Girl-and (2009), Minu-san, cafeteria owner
Saki (2009), Ichita Uchiki
Seitokai Yakuindomo (2010), Kenji
Steins;Gate (2011), 4°C (Shid)
Nichijou (2011), Sakamoto
Maken-ki! (2011), Tanaka
Future Diary (2011), Ōji Kōsaka
Photo Kano (2013), Itta Nakagawa
My Teen Romantic Comedy SNAFU (2013), Ōoka
My Neighbor Seki (2014), Akiyoshi Uzawa
Buddy Complex (2014), Saburota Ogisaka
New Initial D: Legend 1 - Awakening (2014), Itsuki Takeuchi
Doraemon (2015), Sugoroko Dice (Ep.436)
My First Girlfriend Is a Gal (2017), Minoru Kobayakawa
Cutie Honey Universe (2018), Alphonne
The Price of Smiles (2019), Blake Boyer
Ultraman (2019), Shiraishi
Arifureta: From Commonplace to World's Strongest (2019), Daisuke Hiyama
Magatsu Wahrheit -Zuerst- (2020), Jade
Skeleton Knight in Another World (2022), Cetrion
The Fruit of Evolution 2 (2023), Agnos Passion

Video games
 (2005), Male characters
Super Robot Wars UX (2013), Kenji Kondou
Granblue Fantasy (2015), Lowain
MeiQ: Labyrinth of Death (2015), Ganz
Crash Team Racing Nitro-Fueled (2019), Pinstripe Potoroo

References

Maeda, Hisashi. "The Official Art of The Melancholy of Haruhi Suzumiya". (November 2007) Newtype USA. pp. 133–139.

External links
Official blog 
Official agency profile 
Minoru Shiraishi at Ryu's Seiyuu Infos

1978 births
Living people
Anime singers
I'm Enterprise voice actors
Japanese male stage actors
Japanese male video game actors
Japanese male voice actors
Japanese radio personalities
Japanese male singer-songwriters
Japanese singer-songwriters
Japanese television presenters
Lantis (company) artists
Male voice actors from Ehime Prefecture